This is a list of lighthouses in England. It includes lighthouses which are no longer in use as a light but are still standing. It also includes some of the harbour and pier-head lights around the country.

Details of several lighthouses and lightvessels in current use in England, together with Wales, the Channel Islands and Gibraltar can be found on the website of Trinity House. Locations of major lighthouses are shown on the adjacent map.


Active lighthouses
{| class="wikitable sortable" style="text-align:center"
|- bgcolor="#dfdfdf"
! Lighthouse
! class="unsortable" align="center"|Image
! Location & coordinates
! County
! data-sort-type="number"|Year built
! data-sort-type="number"|Tower height
! data-sort-type="number"|Focal height
! data-sort-type="number"|Range
! Operator
! NGA number
|-
!scope='row' |Anvil Point Lighthouse
|style="text-align:center;"|
|style="text-align:center;"|Anvil Point{"type":"Feature","geometry":{"type":"Point","coordinates":[-1.96,50.59194444]}}
|style="text-align:center;"|Dorset
|style="text-align:center;"|1881
|style="text-align:center;"|
|style="text-align:center;"|
|style="text-align:center;"|
|style="text-align:center;"|Trinity House
|style="text-align:center;"|114-0544
|-
!scope='row' |Bamburgh Lighthouse
|style="text-align:center;"|
|style="text-align:center;"|Bamburgh{"type":"Feature","geometry":{"type":"Point","coordinates":[-1.7241666666667,55.616555555556]}}
|style="text-align:center;"|Northumberland
|style="text-align:center;"|1910
|style="text-align:center;"|
|style="text-align:center;"|
|style="text-align:center;"| (white),  (red green)
|style="text-align:center;"|Trinity House
|style="text-align:center;"|114-2252
|-
!scope='row' |Beachy Head Lighthouse
|style="text-align:center;"|
|style="text-align:center;"|Beachy Head{"type":"Feature","geometry":{"type":"Point","coordinates":[0.241459,50.733761]}}
|style="text-align:center;"|Sussex
|style="text-align:center;"|1902
|style="text-align:center;"|
|style="text-align:center;"|
|style="text-align:center;"|
|style="text-align:center;"|Trinity House
|style="text-align:center;"|114-1140
|-
!scope='row' |Berkeley Pill Front light
|style="text-align:center;"|
|style="text-align:center;"|Severn Estuary{"type":"Feature","geometry":{"type":"Point","coordinates":[-2.4901,51.6998]}}
|style="text-align:center;"|Gloucestershire
|style="text-align:center;"|1937
|style="text-align:center;"|
|style="text-align:center;"|
|style="text-align:center;"|
|style="text-align:center;"|Gloucester Harbour Trustees
|style="text-align:center;"|
|-
!scope='row' |Berkeley Pill Rear light
|style="text-align:center;"|
|style="text-align:center;"|Severn Estuary{"type":"Feature","geometry":{"type":"Point","coordinates":[-2.4904,51.6982]}}
|style="text-align:center;"|Gloucestershire
|style="text-align:center;"|1937
|style="text-align:center;"|
|style="text-align:center;"|
|style="text-align:center;"|
|style="text-align:center;"|Gloucester Harbour Trustees
|style="text-align:center;"|
|-
!scope='row' |Berry Head Lighthouse
|style="text-align:center;"|
|style="text-align:center;"|Berry Head{"type":"Feature","geometry":{"type":"Point","coordinates":[-3.4834444444444443,50.39958333333333]}}
|style="text-align:center;"|Devon
|style="text-align:center;"|1906
|style="text-align:center;"|
|style="text-align:center;"|
|style="text-align:center;"|
|style="text-align:center;"|Trinity House
|style="text-align:center;"|114-0344
|-
!scope='row' |Berwick Lighthouse
|style="text-align:center;"|
|style="text-align:center;"|Berwick-upon-Tweed{"type":"Feature","geometry":{"type":"Point","coordinates":[-1.9851527777778,55.764766666667]}}
|style="text-align:center;"|Northumberland
|style="text-align:center;"|1826
|style="text-align:center;"|
|style="text-align:center;"|
|style="text-align:center;"|
|style="text-align:center;"|Port of Berwick
|style="text-align:center;"|114-2264
|-
!scope='row' |Bishop Rock Lighthouse
|style="text-align:center;"|
|style="text-align:center;"|Bishop Rock{"type":"Feature","geometry":{"type":"Point","coordinates":[-6.445,49.871666666667]}}
|style="text-align:center;"|Cornwall
|style="text-align:center;"|1858
|style="text-align:center;"|
|style="text-align:center;"|
|style="text-align:center;"|
|style="text-align:center;"|Trinity House
|style="text-align:center;"|114-4
|-
!scope='row' |Bull Point Lighthouse
|style="text-align:center;"|
|style="text-align:center;"|Mortehoe{"type":"Feature","geometry":{"type":"Point","coordinates":[-4.20111,51.1992]}}
|style="text-align:center;"|Devon
|style="text-align:center;"|1879
|style="text-align:center;"|
|style="text-align:center;"|
|style="text-align:center;"|
|style="text-align:center;"|Trinity House
|style="text-align:center;"|114-6228
|-
!scope='row' |Burnham-on-Sea Low Lighthouse
|style="text-align:center;"|
|style="text-align:center;"|Burnham-on-Sea{"type":"Feature","geometry":{"type":"Point","coordinates":[-3.005847,51.248447]}}
|style="text-align:center;"|Somerset
|style="text-align:center;"|1832
|style="text-align:center;"|
|style="text-align:center;"|
|style="text-align:center;"|
|style="text-align:center;"|Sedgemoor District Council
|style="text-align:center;"|114-6172
|-
!scope='row' |Chapel Rock Lighthouse
|style="text-align:center;"|
|style="text-align:center;"|Gloucestershire{"type":"Feature","geometry":{"type":"Point","coordinates":[-2.6534166666667,51.607119444444]}}
|style="text-align:center;"|Gloucestershire
|style="text-align:center;"|1907
|style="text-align:center;"|
|style="text-align:center;"|
|style="text-align:center;"|
|style="text-align:center;"|Gloucester Harbour Trustees
|style="text-align:center;"|114-5994
|-
!scope='row' |Coquet Lighthouse
|style="text-align:center;"|
|style="text-align:center;"|Hauxley{"type":"Feature","geometry":{"type":"Point","coordinates":[-1.5396,55.334]}}
|style="text-align:center;"|Northumberland
|style="text-align:center;"|1841
|style="text-align:center;"|
|style="text-align:center;"|
|style="text-align:center;"| (white),  (red)
|style="text-align:center;"|Trinity House
|style="text-align:center;"|114-2228
|-
!scope='row' |Cromer Lighthouse
|style="text-align:center;"|
|style="text-align:center;"|Cromer{"type":"Feature","geometry":{"type":"Point","coordinates":[1.316609,52.924648]}}
|style="text-align:center;"|Norfolk
|style="text-align:center;"|1833
|style="text-align:center;"|
|style="text-align:center;"|
|style="text-align:center;"|
|style="text-align:center;"|Trinity House
|style="text-align:center;"|114-1676
|-
!scope='row' |Crow Point Lighthouse
|style="text-align:center;"|
|style="text-align:center;"|Braunton Burrows{"type":"Feature","geometry":{"type":"Point","coordinates":[-4.1898333333333,51.066166666667]}}
|style="text-align:center;"|Devon
|style="text-align:center;"|1954
|style="text-align:center;"|
|style="text-align:center;"|
|style="text-align:center;"| (white),  (red)
|style="text-align:center;"|Trinity House
|style="text-align:center;"|114-6240
|-
!scope='row' |Dungeness Lighthouse
|style="text-align:center;"|
|style="text-align:center;"|Dungeness{"type":"Feature","geometry":{"type":"Point","coordinates":[0.975962,50.9135]}}
|style="text-align:center;"|Kent
|style="text-align:center;"|1961
|style="text-align:center;"|
|style="text-align:center;"|
|style="text-align:center;"|
|style="text-align:center;"|Trinity House
|style="text-align:center;"|114-1220
|-
!scope='row' |Eddystone Lighthouse
|style="text-align:center;"|
|style="text-align:center;"|Eddystone Rocks{"type":"Feature","geometry":{"type":"Point","coordinates":[-4.265,50.18]}}
|style="text-align:center;"|Cornwall
|style="text-align:center;"|1882
|style="text-align:center;"|
|style="text-align:center;"|, 
|style="text-align:center;"| (white),  (red)
|style="text-align:center;"|Trinity House
|style="text-align:center;"|114-132
|-
!scope='row' |Farne Lighthouse
|style="text-align:center;"|
|style="text-align:center;"|Farne Islands{"type":"Feature","geometry":{"type":"Point","coordinates":[-1.655825,55.615414]}}
|style="text-align:center;"|Northumberland
|style="text-align:center;"|1811
|style="text-align:center;"|
|style="text-align:center;"|
|style="text-align:center;"| (white),  (red)
|style="text-align:center;"|Trinity House
|style="text-align:center;"|114-2256
|-
!scope='row' |Flamborough Head Lighthouse
|style="text-align:center;"|
|style="text-align:center;"|Flamborough{"type":"Feature","geometry":{"type":"Point","coordinates":[-0.082553,54.116397]}}
|style="text-align:center;"|Yorkshire
|style="text-align:center;"|1806
|style="text-align:center;"|
|style="text-align:center;"|
|style="text-align:center;"|
|style="text-align:center;"|Trinity House, East Riding of Yorkshire Council
|style="text-align:center;"|114-1964
|-
!scope='row' |Pharos Lighthouse
|style="text-align:center;"|
|style="text-align:center;"|Fleetwood{"type":"Feature","geometry":{"type":"Point","coordinates":[-3.007534362,53.92650231]}}
|style="text-align:center;"|Lancashire
|style="text-align:center;"|1840
|style="text-align:center;"|
|style="text-align:center;"|
|style="text-align:center;"|
|style="text-align:center;"|Port of Fleetwood
|style="text-align:center;"|114-5156
|-
!scope='row' |Beach Lighthouse
|style="text-align:center;"|
|style="text-align:center;"|Fleetwood{"type":"Feature","geometry":{"type":"Point","coordinates":[-3.009091,53.928548]}}
|style="text-align:center;"|Lancashire
|style="text-align:center;"|1840
|style="text-align:center;"|
|style="text-align:center;"|
|style="text-align:center;"|
|style="text-align:center;"|Port of Fleetwood
|style="text-align:center;"|114-5152
|-
!scope='row' |Folkestone Lighthouse
|style="text-align:center;"|
|style="text-align:center;"|Folkestone{"type":"Feature","geometry":{"type":"Point","coordinates":[1.194805,51.076038]}}
|style="text-align:center;"|Kent
|style="text-align:center;"|1860
|style="text-align:center;"|
|style="text-align:center;"|
|style="text-align:center;"|
|style="text-align:center;"|Folkestone Harbour
|style="text-align:center;"|114-1228
|-
!scope='row' |Godrevy Lighthouse
|style="text-align:center;"|
|style="text-align:center;"|St Ives{"type":"Feature","geometry":{"type":"Point","coordinates":[-5.400219,50.242494]}}
|style="text-align:center;"|Cornwall
|style="text-align:center;"|1 Mar 1859
|style="text-align:center;"|
|style="text-align:center;"|
|style="text-align:center;"|
|style="text-align:center;"|Trinity House
|style="text-align:center;"|114-6284
|-
!scope='row' |Gorleston South Pier Lighthouse
|style="text-align:center;"|
|style="text-align:center;"|Gorleston-on-Sea{"type":"Feature","geometry":{"type":"Point","coordinates":[1.738,52.5721]}}
|style="text-align:center;"|Suffolk
|style="text-align:center;"|1955
|style="text-align:center;"|
|style="text-align:center;"|
|style="text-align:center;"|
|style="text-align:center;"|Great Yarmouth Port Authority
|style="text-align:center;"|114-1624
|-
!scope='row' |Guile Point East Lighthouse
|style="text-align:center;"|
|style="text-align:center;"|Lindisfarne{"type":"Feature","geometry":{"type":"Point","coordinates":[-1.79317,55.6582]}}
|style="text-align:center;"|Northumberland
|style="text-align:center;"|1859
|style="text-align:center;"|
|style="text-align:center;"|
|style="text-align:center;"|
|style="text-align:center;"|Trinity House (from Nov 1995), Newcastle-upon-Tyne Trinity House (until Nov 1995)
|style="text-align:center;"|114-2262
|-
!scope='row' |Happisburgh Lighthouse
|style="text-align:center;"|
|style="text-align:center;"|Happisburgh{"type":"Feature","geometry":{"type":"Point","coordinates":[1.53867,52.8195]}}
|style="text-align:center;"|Norfolk
|style="text-align:center;"|1791
|style="text-align:center;"|
|style="text-align:center;"|
|style="text-align:center;"|
|style="text-align:center;"|Trinity House (until 1990), Happisburgh Lighthouse Trust (from 1990)
|style="text-align:center;"|114-1668
|-
!scope='row' |Hartland Point Lighthouse
|style="text-align:center;"|
|style="text-align:center;"|Hartland Point{"type":"Feature","geometry":{"type":"Point","coordinates":[-4.525475,51.022143]}}
|style="text-align:center;"|Devon
|style="text-align:center;"|1874
|style="text-align:center;"|
|style="text-align:center;"|
|style="text-align:center;"|
|style="text-align:center;"|Trinity House
|style="text-align:center;"|114-6252
|-
!scope='row' |Heugh Lighthouse
|style="text-align:center;"|
|style="text-align:center;"|Hartlepool{"type":"Feature","geometry":{"type":"Point","coordinates":[-1.1761111111111,54.6965]}}
|style="text-align:center;"|County Durham
|style="text-align:center;"|1927
|style="text-align:center;"|
|style="text-align:center;"|
|style="text-align:center;"|
|style="text-align:center;"|PD Ports
|style="text-align:center;"|114-2056
|-
!scope='row' |Herd Groyne Light
|style="text-align:center;"|
|style="text-align:center;"|South Shields{"type":"Feature","geometry":{"type":"Point","coordinates":[-1.4240805555556,55.008022222222]}}
|style="text-align:center;"|County Durham
|style="text-align:center;"|1882
|style="text-align:center;"|
|style="text-align:center;"|
|style="text-align:center;"| (white),  (green red)
|style="text-align:center;"|Port of Tyne
|style="text-align:center;"|114-2112
|-
!scope='row' |Heugh Hill Lighthouse
|style="text-align:center;"|
|style="text-align:center;"|Lindisfarne{"type":"Feature","geometry":{"type":"Point","coordinates":[-1.7996,55.66821]}}
|style="text-align:center;"|Northumberland
|style="text-align:center;"|1826
|style="text-align:center;"|
|style="text-align:center;"|
|style="text-align:center;"|
|style="text-align:center;"|Trinity House
|style="text-align:center;"|114-2263
|-
!scope='row' |Hilbre Island Lighthouse
|style="text-align:center;"|
|style="text-align:center;"|Hilbre Island{"type":"Feature","geometry":{"type":"Point","coordinates":[-3.22861111,53.38333333]}}
|style="text-align:center;"|Cheshire
|style="text-align:center;"|1927
|style="text-align:center;"|
|style="text-align:center;"|
|style="text-align:center;"|
|style="text-align:center;"|Trinity House
|style="text-align:center;"|114-5380
|-
!scope='row' |Hurst Point Lighthouse
|style="text-align:center;"|
|style="text-align:center;"|Hurst Castle{"type":"Feature","geometry":{"type":"Point","coordinates":[-1.55028,50.7081]}}
|style="text-align:center;"|Hampshire
|style="text-align:center;"|1867
|style="text-align:center;"|
|style="text-align:center;"|, 
|style="text-align:center;"|Trinity House
|style="text-align:center;"|114-0596
|-
!scope='row' |Ilfracombe Lighthouse
|style="text-align:center;"|
|style="text-align:center;"|Ilfracombe{"type":"Feature","geometry":{"type":"Point","coordinates":[-4.1130083333333,51.211136111111]}}
|style="text-align:center;"|Devon
|style="text-align:center;"|1819
|style="text-align:center;"|
|style="text-align:center;"|
|style="text-align:center;"|
|style="text-align:center;"|Ilfracombe Harbour Board
|style="text-align:center;"|114-6220
|-
!scope='row' |Instow Front Lighthouse
|style="text-align:center;"|
|style="text-align:center;"|Instow{"type":"Feature","geometry":{"type":"Point","coordinates":[-4.177728,51.06035]}}
|style="text-align:center;"|Devon
|style="text-align:center;"|1820
|style="text-align:center;"|
|style="text-align:center;"|
|style="text-align:center;"|
|style="text-align:center;"|Trinity House
|style="text-align:center;"|
|-
!scope='row' |Instow Rear Lighthouse
|style="text-align:center;"|
|style="text-align:center;"|Instow{"type":"Feature","geometry":{"type":"Point","coordinates":[-4.1725833333333,51.058666666667]}}
|style="text-align:center;"|Devon
|style="text-align:center;"|1820
|style="text-align:center;"|
|style="text-align:center;"|
|style="text-align:center;"|
|style="text-align:center;"|Trinity House
|style="text-align:center;"|114-6236
|-
!scope='row' |Killingholme High Lighthouse
|style="text-align:center;"|
|style="text-align:center;"|South Killingholme{"type":"Feature","geometry":{"type":"Point","coordinates":[-0.21885,53.647172]}}
|style="text-align:center;"|Lincolnshire
|style="text-align:center;"|1876
|style="text-align:center;"|
|style="text-align:center;"|
|style="text-align:center;"|
|style="text-align:center;"|Port of Immingham
|style="text-align:center;"|114-1916
|-
!scope='row' |Killingholme South Low Lighthouse
|style="text-align:center;"|
|style="text-align:center;"|South Killingholme{"type":"Feature","geometry":{"type":"Point","coordinates":[-0.216198,53.64654]}}
|style="text-align:center;"|Lincolnshire
|style="text-align:center;"|1836
|style="text-align:center;"|
|style="text-align:center;"|
|style="text-align:center;"|
|style="text-align:center;"|Port of Immingham
|style="text-align:center;"|114-1912
|-
!scope='row' |Lizard Lighthouse
|style="text-align:center;"|
|style="text-align:center;"|Lizard Point{"type":"Feature","geometry":{"type":"Point","coordinates":[-5.20206,49.9602]}}
|style="text-align:center;"|Cornwall
|style="text-align:center;"|1751
|style="text-align:center;"|
|style="text-align:center;"|
|style="text-align:center;"|
|style="text-align:center;"|Trinity House
|style="text-align:center;"|114-0064
|-
!scope='row' |Longships Lighthouse
|style="text-align:center;"|
|style="text-align:center;"|Longships{"type":"Feature","geometry":{"type":"Point","coordinates":[-5.74677,50.06686]}}
|style="text-align:center;"|Cornwall
|style="text-align:center;"|1875
|style="text-align:center;"|
|style="text-align:center;"|
|style="text-align:center;"| (white),  (red)
|style="text-align:center;"|Trinity House
|style="text-align:center;"|114-0024
|-
!scope='row' |Longstone Lighthouse
|style="text-align:center;"|
|style="text-align:center;"|Farne Islands{"type":"Feature","geometry":{"type":"Point","coordinates":[-1.610869,55.643781]}}
|style="text-align:center;"|Northumberland
|style="text-align:center;"|1826
|style="text-align:center;"|
|style="text-align:center;"|
|style="text-align:center;"|, 
|style="text-align:center;"|Trinity House
|style="text-align:center;"|114-2260
|-
!scope='row' |Lowestoft Lighthouse
|style="text-align:center;"|
|style="text-align:center;"|Lowestoft{"type":"Feature","geometry":{"type":"Point","coordinates":[1.758333,52.486667]}}
|style="text-align:center;"|Suffolk
|style="text-align:center;"|1874
|style="text-align:center;"|
|style="text-align:center;"|
|style="text-align:center;"|
|style="text-align:center;"|Trinity House
|style="text-align:center;"|114-1620
|-
!scope='row' |Lundy North Lighthouse
|style="text-align:center;"|
|style="text-align:center;"|Torridge, Lundy{"type":"Feature","geometry":{"type":"Point","coordinates":[-4.677248,51.201738]}}
|style="text-align:center;"|Devon
|style="text-align:center;"|1897
|style="text-align:center;"|
|style="text-align:center;"|
|style="text-align:center;"|
|style="text-align:center;"|Trinity House
|style="text-align:center;"|114-6244
|-
!scope='row' |Lundy South Lighthouse
|style="text-align:center;"|
|style="text-align:center;"|Torridge, Lundy{"type":"Feature","geometry":{"type":"Point","coordinates":[-4.655798,51.162054]}}
|style="text-align:center;"|Devon
|style="text-align:center;"|1897
|style="text-align:center;"|
|style="text-align:center;"|
|style="text-align:center;"|
|style="text-align:center;"|Trinity House
|style="text-align:center;"|114-6248
|-
!scope='row' |Lyde Rock lighthouse
|style="text-align:center;"|
|style="text-align:center;"|Severn Estuary{"type":"Feature","geometry":{"type":"Point","coordinates":[-2.6444,51.6147]}}
|style="text-align:center;"|Gloucestershire
|style="text-align:center;"|2008
|style="text-align:center;"|
|style="text-align:center;"|
|style="text-align:center;"|
|style="text-align:center;"|Gloucester Harbour Trustees
|style="text-align:center;"|
|-
!scope='row' |Lynmouth Foreland Lighthouse
|style="text-align:center;"|
|style="text-align:center;"|Foreland Point{"type":"Feature","geometry":{"type":"Point","coordinates":[-3.786681,51.245389]}}
|style="text-align:center;"|Devon
|style="text-align:center;"|1900
|style="text-align:center;"|
|style="text-align:center;"|
|style="text-align:center;"|
|style="text-align:center;"|Trinity House
|style="text-align:center;"|114-6208
|-
!scope='row' |Maryport New Lighthouse
|style="text-align:center;"|
|style="text-align:center;"|Maryport{"type":"Feature","geometry":{"type":"Point","coordinates":[-3.5105728,54.7177446]}}
|style="text-align:center;"|Cumberland
|style="text-align:center;"|1996
|style="text-align:center;"|, 
|style="text-align:center;"|
|style="text-align:center;"|
|style="text-align:center;"|Trinity House (until 2010), Maryport Harbour Authority (from 2010)
|style="text-align:center;"|114-4860
|-
!scope='row' |Nab Tower
|style="text-align:center;"|
|style="text-align:center;"|Nab Rock{"type":"Feature","geometry":{"type":"Point","coordinates":[-0.951167,50.6675]}}
|style="text-align:center;"|Hampshire
|style="text-align:center;"|1918
|style="text-align:center;"|
|style="text-align:center;"|
|style="text-align:center;"|
|style="text-align:center;"|Trinity House
|style="text-align:center;"|114-1048
|-
!scope='row' |Needles Lighthouse
|style="text-align:center;"|
|style="text-align:center;"|Alum Bay{"type":"Feature","geometry":{"type":"Point","coordinates":[-1.59166667,50.66222222]}}
|style="text-align:center;"|Hampshire
|style="text-align:center;"|1859
|style="text-align:center;"|
|style="text-align:center;"|
|style="text-align:center;"|
|style="text-align:center;"|Trinity House
|style="text-align:center;"|114-0584
|-
!scope='row' |North Foreland Lighthouse
|style="text-align:center;"|
|style="text-align:center;"|North Foreland{"type":"Feature","geometry":{"type":"Point","coordinates":[1.445091,51.374928]}}
|style="text-align:center;"|Kent
|style="text-align:center;"|1691
|style="text-align:center;"|
|style="text-align:center;"|
|style="text-align:center;"|Trinity House
|style="text-align:center;"|114-1364
|-
!scope='row' |Pendeen Lighthouse
|style="text-align:center;"|
|style="text-align:center;"|Pendeen{"type":"Feature","geometry":{"type":"Point","coordinates":[-5.671592,50.1649665]}}
|style="text-align:center;"|Cornwall
|style="text-align:center;"|1900
|style="text-align:center;"|
|style="text-align:center;"|
|style="text-align:center;"|
|style="text-align:center;"|Trinity House
|style="text-align:center;"|114-6304
|-
!scope='row' |Peninnis Lighthouse
|style="text-align:center;"|
|style="text-align:center;"|Peninnis Head{"type":"Feature","geometry":{"type":"Point","coordinates":[-6.3035,49.9046]}}
|style="text-align:center;"|Cornwall
|style="text-align:center;"|1911
|style="text-align:center;"|
|style="text-align:center;"|
|style="text-align:center;"|
|style="text-align:center;"|Trinity House
|style="text-align:center;"|114-8
|-
!scope='row' |Plover Scar Lighthouse
|style="text-align:center;"|
|style="text-align:center;"|Cockersand Abbey{"type":"Feature","geometry":{"type":"Point","coordinates":[-2.882594,53.981512]}}
|style="text-align:center;"|Lancashire
|style="text-align:center;"|1847
|style="text-align:center;"|
|style="text-align:center;"|
|style="text-align:center;"|
|style="text-align:center;"|Lancaster Port Commission
|style="text-align:center;"|114-5144
|-
!scope='row' |Plymouth Breakwater Lighthouse
|style="text-align:center;"|
|style="text-align:center;"|Plymouth Breakwater{"type":"Feature","geometry":{"type":"Point","coordinates":[-4.158773,50.334553]}}
|style="text-align:center;"|Devon
|style="text-align:center;"|1844
|style="text-align:center;"|
|style="text-align:center;"|
|style="text-align:center;"| (white),  (red)
|style="text-align:center;"|Ministry of Defence (from 1993), Trinity House (until 1993)
|style="text-align:center;"|114-148
|-
!scope='row' |Portishead Point Lighthouse
|style="text-align:center;"|
|style="text-align:center;"|Portishead{"type":"Feature","geometry":{"type":"Point","coordinates":[-2.77194,51.4939]}}
|style="text-align:center;"|Somerset
|style="text-align:center;"|1931
|style="text-align:center;"|
|style="text-align:center;"|
|style="text-align:center;"|
|style="text-align:center;"|Port of Bristol
|style="text-align:center;"|114-6144
|-
!scope='row' |Portland Bill Lighthouse
|style="text-align:center;"|
|style="text-align:center;"|Portland Bill{"type":"Feature","geometry":{"type":"Point","coordinates":[-2.456396,50.514281]}}
|style="text-align:center;"|Dorset
|style="text-align:center;"|1903
|style="text-align:center;"|
|style="text-align:center;"|
|style="text-align:center;"|
|style="text-align:center;"|Trinity House
|style="text-align:center;"|114-0448
|-
!scope='row' |Portland Breakwater Lighthouse
|style="text-align:center;"|
|style="text-align:center;"|Isle of Portland{"type":"Feature","geometry":{"type":"Point","coordinates":[-2.4178611111111112,50.58594444444444]}}
|style="text-align:center;"|Dorset
|style="text-align:center;"|1905
|style="text-align:center;"|
|style="text-align:center;"|
|style="text-align:center;"|
|style="text-align:center;"|Portland Harbour Authority
|style="text-align:center;"|114-0464
|-
!scope='row' |Rampside Lighthouse
|style="text-align:center;"|
|style="text-align:center;"|Rampside{"type":"Feature","geometry":{"type":"Point","coordinates":[-3.161195,54.086435]}}
|style="text-align:center;"|Lancashire
|style="text-align:center;"|1875
|style="text-align:center;"|
|style="text-align:center;"|
|style="text-align:center;"|
|style="text-align:center;"|Port of Barrow
|style="text-align:center;"|114-5076
|-
!scope='row' |Ramsgate West Pier Lighthouse
|style="text-align:center;"|
|style="text-align:center;"|Ramsgate{"type":"Feature","geometry":{"type":"Point","coordinates":[1.421474,51.327685]}}
|style="text-align:center;"|Kent
|style="text-align:center;"|1842
|style="text-align:center;"|
|style="text-align:center;"|
|style="text-align:center;"|
|style="text-align:center;"|Port of Ramsgate
|style="text-align:center;"|114-1348
|-
!scope='row' |Roker Pier lighthouse
|style="text-align:center;"|
|style="text-align:center;"|Roker{"type":"Feature","geometry":{"type":"Point","coordinates":[-1.35255,54.921263888889]}}
|style="text-align:center;"|County Durham
|style="text-align:center;"|1903
|style="text-align:center;"|
|style="text-align:center;"|
|style="text-align:center;"|
|style="text-align:center;"|Port of Sunderland
|style="text-align:center;"|114-2084
|-
!scope='row' |Round Island Lighthouse
|style="text-align:center;"|
|style="text-align:center;"|Tresco{"type":"Feature","geometry":{"type":"Point","coordinates":[-6.322992,49.978898]}}
|style="text-align:center;"|Cornwall
|style="text-align:center;"|1887
|style="text-align:center;"|
|style="text-align:center;"|
|style="text-align:center;"|
|style="text-align:center;"|Trinity House
|style="text-align:center;"|114-16
|-
!scope='row' |Royal Sovereign Lighthouse
|style="text-align:center;"|
|style="text-align:center;"|Eastbourne{"type":"Feature","geometry":{"type":"Point","coordinates":[0.4355,50.7233]}}
|style="text-align:center;"|Sussex
|style="text-align:center;"|1971
|style="text-align:center;"|
|style="text-align:center;"|
|style="text-align:center;"|
|style="text-align:center;"|Trinity House
|style="text-align:center;"|114-1144
|-
!scope='row' |St Anthony's Lighthouse
|style="text-align:center;"|
|style="text-align:center;"|St Anthony Head{"type":"Feature","geometry":{"type":"Point","coordinates":[-5.015851,50.141208]}}
|style="text-align:center;"|Cornwall
|style="text-align:center;"|1835
|style="text-align:center;"|
|style="text-align:center;"|
|style="text-align:center;"| (white),  (red)
|style="text-align:center;"|Trinity House
|style="text-align:center;"|114-68
|-
!scope='row' |St Bees Lighthouse
|style="text-align:center;"|
|style="text-align:center;"|St Bees Head{"type":"Feature","geometry":{"type":"Point","coordinates":[-3.6365,54.5137]}}
|style="text-align:center;"|Cumberland
|style="text-align:center;"|1822
|style="text-align:center;"|
|style="text-align:center;"|
|style="text-align:center;"|
|style="text-align:center;"|Trinity House
|style="text-align:center;"|114-4892
|-
!scope='row' |St. Catherine's Lighthouse
|style="text-align:center;"|
|style="text-align:center;"|St. Catherine's Point{"type":"Feature","geometry":{"type":"Point","coordinates":[-1.2979,50.5757]}}
|style="text-align:center;"|Hampshire
|style="text-align:center;"|1838
|style="text-align:center;"|
|style="text-align:center;"|
|style="text-align:center;"|
|style="text-align:center;"|Trinity House
|style="text-align:center;"|114-1064
|-
!scope='row' |Scarborough Lighthouse
|style="text-align:center;"|
|style="text-align:center;"|Scarborough{"type":"Feature","geometry":{"type":"Point","coordinates":[-0.389923,54.281885]}}
|style="text-align:center;"|Yorkshire
|style="text-align:center;"|1931
|style="text-align:center;"|
|style="text-align:center;"|
|style="text-align:center;"|
|style="text-align:center;"|Scarborough Borough Council
|style="text-align:center;"|114-1976
|-
!scope='row' |Shoreham Lighthouse
|style="text-align:center;"|
|style="text-align:center;"|Kingston by Sea{"type":"Feature","geometry":{"type":"Point","coordinates":[-0.248213839,50.83087226]}}
|style="text-align:center;"|Sussex
|style="text-align:center;"|1846
|style="text-align:center;"|
|style="text-align:center;"|
|style="text-align:center;"|
|style="text-align:center;"|Shoreham Port Authority
|style="text-align:center;"|114-1116
|-
!scope='row' |South Gare Lighthouse
|style="text-align:center;"|
|style="text-align:center;"|South Gare{"type":"Feature","geometry":{"type":"Point","coordinates":[-1.137455,54.647413]}}
|style="text-align:center;"|Yorkshire
|style="text-align:center;"|1884
|style="text-align:center;"|
|style="text-align:center;"|
|style="text-align:center;"| (white),  (red)
|style="text-align:center;"|PD Ports
|style="text-align:center;"|114-2020
|-
!scope='row' |Southwold Lighthouse
|style="text-align:center;"|
|style="text-align:center;"|Southwold{"type":"Feature","geometry":{"type":"Point","coordinates":[1.68137,52.32722]}}
|style="text-align:center;"|Suffolk
|style="text-align:center;"|1887
|style="text-align:center;"|
|style="text-align:center;"|
|style="text-align:center;"|
|style="text-align:center;"|Trinity House
|style="text-align:center;"|114-1588
|-
!scope='row' |Start Point Lighthouse
|style="text-align:center;"|
|style="text-align:center;"|Start Point{"type":"Feature","geometry":{"type":"Point","coordinates":[-3.642282,50.222439]}}
|style="text-align:center;"|Devon
|style="text-align:center;"|1836
|style="text-align:center;"|
|style="text-align:center;"|, 
|style="text-align:center;"| (white),  (red)
|style="text-align:center;"|Trinity House
|style="text-align:center;"|114-0324
|-
!scope='row' |Tater Du Lighthouse
|style="text-align:center;"|
|style="text-align:center;"|Tregurnow{"type":"Feature","geometry":{"type":"Point","coordinates":[-5.57667,50.052]}}
|style="text-align:center;"|Cornwall
|style="text-align:center;"|1965
|style="text-align:center;"|
|style="text-align:center;"|
|style="text-align:center;"|
|style="text-align:center;"|Trinity House
|style="text-align:center;"|114-0032
|-
!scope='row' |Teignmouth Lighthouse
|style="text-align:center;"|
|style="text-align:center;"|Teignmouth{"type":"Feature","geometry":{"type":"Point","coordinates":[-3.496815,50.542496]}}
|style="text-align:center;"|Devon
|style="text-align:center;"|1845
|style="text-align:center;"|
|style="text-align:center;"|
|style="text-align:center;"|
|style="text-align:center;"|Teignmouth Harbour Commission
|style="text-align:center;"|114-392
|-
!scope='row' |Thorngumbald Clough High Lighthouse
|style="text-align:center;"|
|style="text-align:center;"|Paull{"type":"Feature","geometry":{"type":"Point","coordinates":[-0.225611,53.708086]}}
|style="text-align:center;"|Yorkshire
|style="text-align:center;"|1870
|style="text-align:center;"|
|style="text-align:center;"|
|style="text-align:center;"|
|style="text-align:center;"|Port of Hull
|style="text-align:center;"|114-1932
|-
!scope='row' |Thorngumbald Clough Low Lighthouse
|style="text-align:center;"|
|style="text-align:center;"|Paull{"type":"Feature","geometry":{"type":"Point","coordinates":[-0.226884,53.708797]}}
|style="text-align:center;"|Yorkshire
|style="text-align:center;"|1870
|style="text-align:center;"|
|style="text-align:center;"|
|style="text-align:center;"|
|style="text-align:center;"|Port of Hull
|style="text-align:center;"|114-1928
|-
!scope='row' |Trevose Head Lighthouse
|style="text-align:center;"|
|style="text-align:center;"|Trevose Head{"type":"Feature","geometry":{"type":"Point","coordinates":[-5.035141,50.549232]}}
|style="text-align:center;"|Cornwall
|style="text-align:center;"|1847
|style="text-align:center;"|
|style="text-align:center;"|
|style="text-align:center;"|
|style="text-align:center;"|Trinity House
|style="text-align:center;"|114-6272
|-
!scope='row' |Tynemouth North Pier light
|style="text-align:center;"|
|style="text-align:center;"|Tynemouth{"type":"Feature","geometry":{"type":"Point","coordinates":[-1.402941,55.01451]}}
|style="text-align:center;"|Northumberland
|style="text-align:center;"|1903
|style="text-align:center;"|
|style="text-align:center;"|
|style="text-align:center;"|
|style="text-align:center;"|Port of Tyne
|style="text-align:center;"|114-2104
|-
!scope='row' |Tyne South Pier light
|style="text-align:center;"|
|style="text-align:center;"|South Shields{"type":"Feature","geometry":{"type":"Point","coordinates":[-1.4009805555556,55.011208333333]}}
|style="text-align:center;"|County Durham
|style="text-align:center;"|1895
|style="text-align:center;"|
|style="text-align:center;"|
|style="text-align:center;"|
|style="text-align:center;"|Port of Tyne
|style="text-align:center;"|114-2108
|-
!scope='row' |Walney Lighthouse
|style="text-align:center;"|
|style="text-align:center;"|Walney Island{"type":"Feature","geometry":{"type":"Point","coordinates":[-3.1772,54.0486]}}
|style="text-align:center;"|Lancashire
|style="text-align:center;"|1804
|style="text-align:center;"|
|style="text-align:center;"|
|style="text-align:center;"|
|style="text-align:center;"|Lancaster Port Commission
|style="text-align:center;"|114-5052
|-
!scope='row' |Watchet Harbour Lighthouse
|style="text-align:center;"|
|style="text-align:center;"|Watchet{"type":"Feature","geometry":{"type":"Point","coordinates":[-3.3289,51.183]}}
|style="text-align:center;"|Somerset
|style="text-align:center;"|1862
|style="text-align:center;"|
|style="text-align:center;"|
|style="text-align:center;"|
|style="text-align:center;"|Watchet Marina
|style="text-align:center;"|114-6196
|-
!scope='row' |Whitby Lighthouse
|style="text-align:center;"|
|style="text-align:center;"|Whitby{"type":"Feature","geometry":{"type":"Point","coordinates":[-0.568333,54.4778]}}
|style="text-align:center;"|Yorkshire
|style="text-align:center;"|1858
|style="text-align:center;"|
|style="text-align:center;"|
|style="text-align:center;"|
|style="text-align:center;"|Trinity House
|style="text-align:center;"|114-1992
|-
!scope='row' |Whitby East Pier beacon
|style="text-align:center;"|
|style="text-align:center;"|Whitby{"type":"Feature","geometry":{"type":"Point","coordinates":[-0.6123,54.494116666667]}}
|style="text-align:center;"|Yorkshire
|style="text-align:center;"|1914
|style="text-align:center;"|
|style="text-align:center;"|
|style="text-align:center;"|
|style="text-align:center;"|Scarborough Borough Council
|style="text-align:center;"|114-1988
|-
!scope='row' |Whitby West Pier beacon
|style="text-align:center;"|
|style="text-align:center;"|Whitby{"type":"Feature","geometry":{"type":"Point","coordinates":[-0.61325,54.494216666667]}}
|style="text-align:center;"|Yorkshire
|style="text-align:center;"|1914
|style="text-align:center;"|
|style="text-align:center;"|
|style="text-align:center;"|
|style="text-align:center;"|Scarborough Borough Council
|style="text-align:center;"|114-1984
|-
!scope='row' |Whitby East Pier Lighthouse
|style="text-align:center;"|
|style="text-align:center;"|Whitby, North Yorkshire{"type":"Feature","geometry":{"type":"Point","coordinates":[-0.611836,54.492848]}}
|style="text-align:center;"|Yorkshire
|style="text-align:center;"|1855
|style="text-align:center;"|
|style="text-align:center;"|
|style="text-align:center;"|
|style="text-align:center;"|Whitby Harbour Board
|style="text-align:center;"|
|-
!scope='row' |Whitby West Pier Lighthouse
|style="text-align:center;"|
|style="text-align:center;"|Whitby{"type":"Feature","geometry":{"type":"Point","coordinates":[-0.612916,54.49287]}}
|style="text-align:center;"|Yorkshire
|style="text-align:center;"|1831
|style="text-align:center;"|
|style="text-align:center;"|
|style="text-align:center;"|
|style="text-align:center;"|Whitby Harbour Board
|style="text-align:center;"|
|-
!scope='row' |West Pier Lighthouse
|style="text-align:center;"|
|style="text-align:center;"|Whitehaven{"type":"Feature","geometry":{"type":"Point","coordinates":[-3.598568,54.552817]}}
|style="text-align:center;"|Cumberland
|style="text-align:center;"|1839
|style="text-align:center;"|
|style="text-align:center;"|
|style="text-align:center;"|
|style="text-align:center;"|Whitehaven Harbour Commissioners
|style="text-align:center;"|114-4880
|-
!scope='row' |Whitgift Lighthouse
|style="text-align:center;"|
|style="text-align:center;"|Whitgift{"type":"Feature","geometry":{"type":"Point","coordinates":[-0.757552,53.698837]}}
|style="text-align:center;"|Yorkshire
|style="text-align:center;"|
|style="text-align:center;"|
|style="text-align:center;"|
|style="text-align:center;"|
|style="text-align:center;"|Associated British Ports
|style="text-align:center;"|
|-
!scope='row' |Wolf Rock Lighthouse
|style="text-align:center;"|
|style="text-align:center;"|Wolf Rock{"type":"Feature","geometry":{"type":"Point","coordinates":[-5.80833,49.9453]}}
|style="text-align:center;"|Cornwall
|style="text-align:center;"|1869
|style="text-align:center;"|
|style="text-align:center;"|
|style="text-align:center;"|
|style="text-align:center;"|Trinity House
|style="text-align:center;"|114-28
|}

Inactive lighthouses
{| class="wikitable sortable" style="text-align:center"
|- bgcolor="#dfdfdf"
! Lighthouse
! class="unsortable" align="center" width="120px"|Image
! Location  coordinates
! County
! data-sort-type="number"|First lit
! data-sort-type="number"|
! data-sort-type="number"|Tower height
! Former operator(s)
|-
!scope='row' |Belle Tout Lighthouse
|style="text-align:center;"|
|style="text-align:center;"|Beachy Head{"type":"Feature","geometry":{"type":"Point","coordinates":[0.2145,50.7382]}}
|style="text-align:center;"|Sussex
|style="text-align:center;"|1834
|style="text-align:center;"|1902
|style="text-align:center;"|
|style="text-align:center;"|Trinity House (until 1902)
|-
!scope='row' |Bidston Lighthouse
|style="text-align:center;"|
|style="text-align:center;"|Bidston Hill{"type":"Feature","geometry":{"type":"Point","coordinates":[-3.074251,53.401096]}}
|style="text-align:center;"|Cheshire
|style="text-align:center;"|1873
|style="text-align:center;"|1913
|style="text-align:center;"|
|style="text-align:center;"|Mersey Docks and Harbour Company (until 1913)
|-
!scope='row' |Black Nore Lighthouse
|style="text-align:center;"|
|style="text-align:center;"|Portishead{"type":"Feature","geometry":{"type":"Point","coordinates":[-2.79972,51.4847]}}
|style="text-align:center;"|Somerset
|style="text-align:center;"|1894
|style="text-align:center;"|2010
|style="text-align:center;"|
|style="text-align:center;"|Trinity House (until Sep 2010)
|-
!scope='row' |Blyth High Light
|style="text-align:center;"|
|style="text-align:center;"|Blyth{"type":"Feature","geometry":{"type":"Point","coordinates":[-1.500052,55.125471]}}
|style="text-align:center;"|Northumberland
|style="text-align:center;"|1788
|style="text-align:center;"|1985
|style="text-align:center;"|
|style="text-align:center;"|
|-
!scope='row' |Trinity Buoy Wharf
|style="text-align:center;"|
|style="text-align:center;"|London Borough of Tower Hamlets{"type":"Feature","geometry":{"type":"Point","coordinates":[0.008305555555555556,51.50772222222222]}}
|style="text-align:center;"|Middlesex
|style="text-align:center;"|1863
|style="text-align:center;"|1988
|style="text-align:center;"|
|style="text-align:center;"|Trinity House (until Dec 1988)
|-
!scope='row' |Brownsman Lighthouse
|style="text-align:center;"|
|style="text-align:center;"|Farne Islands{"type":"Feature","geometry":{"type":"Point","coordinates":[-1.62564,55.634221]}}
|style="text-align:center;"|Northumberland
|style="text-align:center;"|1811
|style="text-align:center;"|1826
|style="text-align:center;"|
|style="text-align:center;"|Trinity House (from 1811 until 1826)
|-
!scope='row' |Burnham-on-Sea High Lighthouse
|style="text-align:center;"|
|style="text-align:center;"|Burnham-on-Sea{"type":"Feature","geometry":{"type":"Point","coordinates":[-2.999065,51.24891]}}
|style="text-align:center;"|Somerset
|style="text-align:center;"|1832
|style="text-align:center;"|1996
|style="text-align:center;"|
|style="text-align:center;"|Trinity House (until 1993)
|-
!scope='row' |Burnham-on-Sea Round Tower
|style="text-align:center;"|
|style="text-align:center;"|Burnham-on-Sea{"type":"Feature","geometry":{"type":"Point","coordinates":[-2.99833,51.2397]}}
|style="text-align:center;"|Somerset
|style="text-align:center;"|1801
|style="text-align:center;"|1832
|style="text-align:center;"|
|style="text-align:center;"|Trinity House (from 1829 until Dec 1832)
|-
!scope='row' |Chalk Tower
|style="text-align:center;"|
|style="text-align:center;"|Flamborough Head{"type":"Feature","geometry":{"type":"Point","coordinates":[-0.0895948,54.118]}}
|style="text-align:center;"|Yorkshire
|style="text-align:center;"|1674n/a
|style="text-align:center;"|
|style="text-align:center;"|
|-
!scope='row' |Dovercourt High Light
|style="text-align:center;"|
|style="text-align:center;"|Dovercourt{"type":"Feature","geometry":{"type":"Point","coordinates":[1.2753,51.9304]}}
|style="text-align:center;"|Essex
|style="text-align:center;"|1863
|style="text-align:center;"|1917
|style="text-align:center;"|
|style="text-align:center;"|Trinity House (until 1917)
|-
!scope='row' |Dovercourt Low Light
|style="text-align:center;"|
|style="text-align:center;"|Dovercourt{"type":"Feature","geometry":{"type":"Point","coordinates":[1.2781,51.9301]}}
|style="text-align:center;"|Essex
|style="text-align:center;"|1863
|style="text-align:center;"|1917
|style="text-align:center;"|
|style="text-align:center;"|Trinity House (until 1917)
|-
!scope='row' |Dubris Pharos
|style="text-align:center;"|
|style="text-align:center;"|Dover Castle{"type":"Feature","geometry":{"type":"Point","coordinates":[1.32298,51.1284]}}
|style="text-align:center;"|Kent
|style="text-align:center;"|2nd century
|style="text-align:center;"|
|style="text-align:center;"|
|style="text-align:center;"|
|-
!scope='row' |Dungeness Old Lighthouse
|style="text-align:center;"|
|style="text-align:center;"|Dungeness{"type":"Feature","geometry":{"type":"Point","coordinates":[0.969698,50.913758]}}
|style="text-align:center;"|Kent
|style="text-align:center;"|1904
|style="text-align:center;"|1961
|style="text-align:center;"|
|style="text-align:center;"|Trinity House (until 1961)
|-
!scope='row' |Egypt Point light
|style="text-align:center;"|
|style="text-align:center;"|Egypt Point{"type":"Feature","geometry":{"type":"Point","coordinates":[-1.313902,50.76732]}}
|style="text-align:center;"|Hampshire
|style="text-align:center;"|1897
|style="text-align:center;"|1989
|style="text-align:center;"|
|style="text-align:center;"|Trinity House (until 1989)
|-
!scope='row' |Ellesmere Port Lighthouse
|style="text-align:center;"|
|style="text-align:center;"|Ellesmere Port{"type":"Feature","geometry":{"type":"Point","coordinates":[-2.892,53.288]}}
|style="text-align:center;"|Cheshire
|style="text-align:center;"|1880
|style="text-align:center;"|1894
|style="text-align:center;"|
|style="text-align:center;"|
|-
!scope='row' |Fish Quay High Light
|style="text-align:center;"|
|style="text-align:center;"|North Shields Fish Quay{"type":"Feature","geometry":{"type":"Point","coordinates":[-1.437907,55.008725]}}
|style="text-align:center;"|Northumberland
|style="text-align:center;"|1807
|style="text-align:center;"|1999
|style="text-align:center;"|
|style="text-align:center;"|Newcastle-upon-Tyne Trinity House (until 1990s), Port of Tyne
|-
!scope='row' |Fish Quay Low Light
|style="text-align:center;"|
|style="text-align:center;"|North Shields Fish Quay{"type":"Feature","geometry":{"type":"Point","coordinates":[-1.434512,55.009124]}}
|style="text-align:center;"|Northumberland
|style="text-align:center;"|1807
|style="text-align:center;"|1999
|style="text-align:center;"|
|style="text-align:center;"|Newcastle-upon-Tyne Trinity House (until 1990s), Port of Tyne
|-
!scope='row' |Fish Quay Old High Light
|style="text-align:center;"|
|style="text-align:center;"|North Shields Fish Quay{"type":"Feature","geometry":{"type":"Point","coordinates":[-1.436871,55.009341]}}
|style="text-align:center;"|Northumberland
|style="text-align:center;"|1727
|style="text-align:center;"|1810
|style="text-align:center;"|
|style="text-align:center;"|Newcastle-upon-Tyne Trinity House (until 1810)
|-
!scope='row' |Fish Quay Old Low Light
|style="text-align:center;"|
|style="text-align:center;"|North Shields Fish Quay{"type":"Feature","geometry":{"type":"Point","coordinates":[-1.4333333333333,55.009722222222]}}
|style="text-align:center;"|Northumberland
|style="text-align:center;"|1727
|style="text-align:center;"|1810
|style="text-align:center;"|
|style="text-align:center;"|Newcastle-upon-Tyne Trinity House (until 1810), Tyne & Wear Building Preservation Trust
|-
!scope='row' |Gorleston Lighthouse
|style="text-align:center;"|
|style="text-align:center;"|Gorleston-on-Sea{"type":"Feature","geometry":{"type":"Point","coordinates":[1.732274,52.572172]}}
|style="text-align:center;"|Suffolk
|style="text-align:center;"|1878
|style="text-align:center;"|2007
|style="text-align:center;"|
|style="text-align:center;"|Great Yarmouth Port Authority (until 2007)
|-
!scope='row' |Gunfleet Lighthouse
|style="text-align:center;"|
|style="text-align:center;"|Frinton-on-Sea{"type":"Feature","geometry":{"type":"Point","coordinates":[1.3575,51.7792]}}
|style="text-align:center;"|Essex
|style="text-align:center;"|1850
|style="text-align:center;"|1921
|style="text-align:center;"|
|style="text-align:center;"|
|-
!scope='row' |Hale Head Lighthouse
|style="text-align:center;"|
|style="text-align:center;"|Hale{"type":"Feature","geometry":{"type":"Point","coordinates":[-2.7941972222222,53.322438888889]}}
|style="text-align:center;"|Lancashire
|style="text-align:center;"|1906
|style="text-align:center;"|1958
|style="text-align:center;"|
|style="text-align:center;"|
|-
!scope='row' |Harwich High Lighthouse
|style="text-align:center;"|
|style="text-align:center;"|Harwich{"type":"Feature","geometry":{"type":"Point","coordinates":[1.28858,51.9445]}}
|style="text-align:center;"|Essex
|style="text-align:center;"|1818
|style="text-align:center;"|1863
|style="text-align:center;"|
|style="text-align:center;"|Trinity House (until 1863), The Harwich Society
|-
!scope='row' |Harwich Low Lighthouse
|style="text-align:center;"|
|style="text-align:center;"|Harwich{"type":"Feature","geometry":{"type":"Point","coordinates":[1.29096,51.9434]}}
|style="text-align:center;"|Essex
|style="text-align:center;"|1818
|style="text-align:center;"|1863
|style="text-align:center;"|
|style="text-align:center;"|Trinity House (until 1863)
|-
!scope='row' |Hodbarrow Beacon
|style="text-align:center;"|
|style="text-align:center;"|Millom{"type":"Feature","geometry":{"type":"Point","coordinates":[-3.25831,54.1941]}}
|style="text-align:center;"|Cumberland
|style="text-align:center;"|1866
|style="text-align:center;"|1905
|style="text-align:center;"|
|style="text-align:center;"|Hodbarrow Mining Company (until 1905)
|-
!scope='row' |Hodbarrow Haverigg Lighthouse
|style="text-align:center;"|
|style="text-align:center;"|Haverigg{"type":"Feature","geometry":{"type":"Point","coordinates":[-3.2675,54.1904]}}
|style="text-align:center;"|Cumberland
|style="text-align:center;"|1905
|style="text-align:center;"|1949
|style="text-align:center;"|
|style="text-align:center;"|Hodbarrow Mining Company (until 1946), Hodbarrow Nature Reserve
|-
!scope='row' |Hoylake Lighthouse
|style="text-align:center;"|
|style="text-align:center;"|Hoylake, Wirral{"type":"Feature","geometry":{"type":"Point","coordinates":[-3.182459,53.39201]}}
|style="text-align:center;"|Cheshire
|style="text-align:center;"|1865
|style="text-align:center;"|14 May 1886
|style="text-align:center;"|
|style="text-align:center;"|Mersey Docks and Harbour Company (until 1886)
|-
!scope='row' |Old Hunstanton Lighthouse
|style="text-align:center;"|
|style="text-align:center;"|Hunstanton{"type":"Feature","geometry":{"type":"Point","coordinates":[0.493617,52.949629]}}
|style="text-align:center;"|Norfolk
|style="text-align:center;"|1840
|style="text-align:center;"|1922
|style="text-align:center;"|
|style="text-align:center;"|Trinity House (until 1922)
|-
!scope='row' |Killingholme North Low Lighthouse
|style="text-align:center;"|
|style="text-align:center;"|South Killingholme{"type":"Feature","geometry":{"type":"Point","coordinates":[-0.21961,53.649242]}}
|style="text-align:center;"|Lincolnshire
|style="text-align:center;"|1851
|style="text-align:center;"|1920
|style="text-align:center;"|
|style="text-align:center;"|Hull Trinity House (until 1920)
|-
!scope='row' |Leasowe Lighthouse
|style="text-align:center;"|
|style="text-align:center;"|Leasowe{"type":"Feature","geometry":{"type":"Point","coordinates":[-3.1257777777778,53.413166666667]}}
|style="text-align:center;"|Cheshire
|style="text-align:center;"|1763
|style="text-align:center;"|1908
|style="text-align:center;"|
|style="text-align:center;"|Mersey Docks and Harbour Company (until 1908)
|-
!scope='row' |Lundy Old Light
|style="text-align:center;"|
|style="text-align:center;"|Torridge, Lundy{"type":"Feature","geometry":{"type":"Point","coordinates":[-4.67319,51.1673]}}
|style="text-align:center;"|Devon
|style="text-align:center;"|1820
|style="text-align:center;"|1897
|style="text-align:center;"|
|style="text-align:center;"|Trinity House (until 1897)
|-
!scope='row' |Maryport Old Lighthouse
|style="text-align:center;"|
|style="text-align:center;"|Maryport{"type":"Feature","geometry":{"type":"Point","coordinates":[-3.5075538851969,54.716911994083]}}
|style="text-align:center;"|Cumberland
|style="text-align:center;"|1846
|style="text-align:center;"|1996
|style="text-align:center;"|
|style="text-align:center;"|
|-
!scope='row' |New Brighton Lighthouse
|style="text-align:center;"|
|style="text-align:center;"|New Brighton{"type":"Feature","geometry":{"type":"Point","coordinates":[-3.04231,53.4443]}}
|style="text-align:center;"|Cheshire
|style="text-align:center;"|1830
|style="text-align:center;"|1973
|style="text-align:center;"|
|style="text-align:center;"|Mersey Docks and Harbour Company (until 1973)
|-
!scope='row' |Orfordness Lighthouse
|style="text-align:center;"|
|style="text-align:center;"|Orford Ness{"type":"Feature","geometry":{"type":"Point","coordinates":[1.5743,52.0839]}}
|style="text-align:center;"|Suffolk
|style="text-align:center;"|1792
|style="text-align:center;"|2013
|style="text-align:center;"|
|style="text-align:center;"|Trinity House (until 2013)
|-
!scope='row' |Pakefield Lighthouse
|style="text-align:center;"|
|style="text-align:center;"|Pakefield{"type":"Feature","geometry":{"type":"Point","coordinates":[1.7293,52.437]}}
|style="text-align:center;"|Suffolk
|style="text-align:center;"|1832
|style="text-align:center;"|1864
|style="text-align:center;"|
|style="text-align:center;"|Trinity House (until 1864)
|-
!scope='row' |Paull Lighthouse
|style="text-align:center;"|
|style="text-align:center;"|Paull{"type":"Feature","geometry":{"type":"Point","coordinates":[-0.234323,53.718939]}}
|style="text-align:center;"|Yorkshire
|style="text-align:center;"|1836
|style="text-align:center;"|1870
|style="text-align:center;"|
|style="text-align:center;"|Hull Trinity House (until 1870)
|-
!scope='row' |Portland Bill High Light
|style="text-align:center;"|
|style="text-align:center;"|Portland Bill{"type":"Feature","geometry":{"type":"Point","coordinates":[-2.456431,50.522303]}}
|style="text-align:center;"|Dorset
|style="text-align:center;"|1869
|style="text-align:center;"|1906
|style="text-align:center;"|
|style="text-align:center;"|Trinity House (until 1906)
|-
!scope='row' |Portland Bill Low Light
|style="text-align:center;"|
|style="text-align:center;"|Portland Bill{"type":"Feature","geometry":{"type":"Point","coordinates":[-2.451088,50.519671]}}
|style="text-align:center;"|Dorset
|style="text-align:center;"|1869
|style="text-align:center;"|1906
|style="text-align:center;"|
|style="text-align:center;"|Trinity House (until 1906)
|-
!scope='row' |St Agnes Lighthouse
|style="text-align:center;"|
|style="text-align:center;"|St Agnes{"type":"Feature","geometry":{"type":"Point","coordinates":[-6.34543,49.8925]}}
|style="text-align:center;"|Cornwall
|style="text-align:center;"|1680
|style="text-align:center;"|1911
|style="text-align:center;"|
|style="text-align:center;"|Trinity House
|-
!scope='row' |St Catherine's Oratory
|style="text-align:center;"|
|style="text-align:center;"|St. Catherine's Down{"type":"Feature","geometry":{"type":"Point","coordinates":[-1.303963,50.593154]}}
|style="text-align:center;"|Hampshire
|style="text-align:center;"|1328
|style="text-align:center;"|1547
|style="text-align:center;"|
|style="text-align:center;"|English Heritage
|-
!scope='row' |St. Mary's Lighthouse
|style="text-align:center;"|
|style="text-align:center;"|St Mary's Island{"type":"Feature","geometry":{"type":"Point","coordinates":[-1.449599,55.071701]}}
|style="text-align:center;"|Northumberland
|style="text-align:center;"|1898
|style="text-align:center;"|1984
|style="text-align:center;"|
|style="text-align:center;"|Trinity House (until 1984)
|-
!scope='row' |Seaton Carew Lighthouse
|style="text-align:center;"|
|style="text-align:center;"|Hartlepool{"type":"Feature","geometry":{"type":"Point","coordinates":[-1.1891,54.6669]}}
|style="text-align:center;"|County Durham
|style="text-align:center;"|1838
|style="text-align:center;"|1892
|style="text-align:center;"|
|style="text-align:center;"|Tees Navigation Company (until 1892)
|-
!scope='row' |Smeaton's Tower
|style="text-align:center;"|
|style="text-align:center;"|Plymouth Hoe{"type":"Feature","geometry":{"type":"Point","coordinates":[-4.14183,50.3644]}}
|style="text-align:center;"|Devon
|style="text-align:center;"|1759
|style="text-align:center;"|1877
|style="text-align:center;"|
|style="text-align:center;"|Trinity House (until 1879)
|-
!scope='row' |Souter Lighthouse
|style="text-align:center;"|
|style="text-align:center;"|Marsden{"type":"Feature","geometry":{"type":"Point","coordinates":[-1.36409,54.9705]}}
|style="text-align:center;"|County Durham
|style="text-align:center;"|1871
|style="text-align:center;"|1988
|style="text-align:center;"|
|style="text-align:center;"|Trinity House (until 1984), National Trust
|-
!scope='row' |South Foreland Upper Lighthouse
|style="text-align:center;"|
|style="text-align:center;"|South Foreland{"type":"Feature","geometry":{"type":"Point","coordinates":[1.3711,51.1404]}}
|style="text-align:center;"|Kent
|style="text-align:center;"|1843
|style="text-align:center;"|1988
|style="text-align:center;"|
|style="text-align:center;"|Trinity House (until 1988)
|-
!scope='row' |South Foreland Lower Lighthouse
|style="text-align:center;"|
|style="text-align:center;"|South Foreland{"type":"Feature","geometry":{"type":"Point","coordinates":[1.376097,51.14095291]}}
|style="text-align:center;"|Kent
|style="text-align:center;"|1846
|style="text-align:center;"|1904
|style="text-align:center;"|
|style="text-align:center;"|Trinity House (until 1910)
|-
!scope='row' |Southsea Castle lighthouse
|style="text-align:center;"|
|style="text-align:center;"|Southsea Castle{"type":"Feature","geometry":{"type":"Point","coordinates":[-1.089018,50.778324]}}
|style="text-align:center;"|Hampshire
|style="text-align:center;"|1828
|style="text-align:center;"|2017
|style="text-align:center;"|
|style="text-align:center;"|Ministry of Defence (until 2017)
|-
!scope='row' |Spurn Lighthouse
|style="text-align:center;"|
|style="text-align:center;"|Spurn Point{"type":"Feature","geometry":{"type":"Point","coordinates":[0.118328,53.578975]}}
|style="text-align:center;"|Yorkshire
|style="text-align:center;"|1895
|style="text-align:center;"|1985
|style="text-align:center;"|
|style="text-align:center;"|Trinity House (until 1985)
|-
!scope='row' |Spurn Point Low Light
|style="text-align:center;"|
|style="text-align:center;"|Spurn{"type":"Feature","geometry":{"type":"Point","coordinates":[0.115971,53.578962]}}
|style="text-align:center;"|Yorkshire
|style="text-align:center;"|1852
|style="text-align:center;"|1895
|style="text-align:center;"|
|style="text-align:center;"|Trinity House (until 1895)
|-
!scope='row' |Winterton Lighthouse
|style="text-align:center;"|
|style="text-align:center;"|Winterton-on-Sea{"type":"Feature","geometry":{"type":"Point","coordinates":[1.6953,52.713]}}
|style="text-align:center;"|Norfolk
|style="text-align:center;"|1840
|style="text-align:center;"|1921
|style="text-align:center;"|
|style="text-align:center;"|Trinity House (until 1921)
|-
!scope='row' |Withernsea Lighthouse
|style="text-align:center;"|
|style="text-align:center;"|Withernsea{"type":"Feature","geometry":{"type":"Point","coordinates":[0.028751,53.73091]}}
|style="text-align:center;"|Yorkshire
|style="text-align:center;"|1894
|style="text-align:center;"|1972
|style="text-align:center;"|
|style="text-align:center;"|Trinity House (until 1976)
|-
!scope='row' |Wyre Light
|style="text-align:center;"|
|style="text-align:center;"|Fleetwood{"type":"Feature","geometry":{"type":"Point","coordinates":[-3.027,53.953]}}
|style="text-align:center;"|Lancashire
|style="text-align:center;"|1840
|style="text-align:center;"|1979
|style="text-align:center;"|
|style="text-align:center;"|
|-
!scope='row' |West Bank Lighthouse
|style="text-align:center;"|
|style="text-align:center;"|Sutton Bridge{"type":"Feature","geometry":{"type":"Point","coordinates":[0.210826,52.8087]}}
|style="text-align:center;"|Lincolnshire
|style="text-align:center;"|1830s
|style="text-align:center;"|
|style="text-align:center;"|
|style="text-align:center;"|
|-
!scope='row' |East Bank Lighthouse
|style="text-align:center;"|
|style="text-align:center;"|Sutton Bridge{"type":"Feature","geometry":{"type":"Point","coordinates":[0.213687,52.8083]}}
|style="text-align:center;"|Lincolnshire
|style="text-align:center;"|1830s
|style="text-align:center;"|
|style="text-align:center;"|
|style="text-align:center;"|
|}

See also
Lists of lighthouses
List of lighthouses in Wales
List of lighthouses in Scotland
List of lighthouses in the Isle of Man
List of lighthouses in Ireland
List of lighthouses in the Channel Islands

Notes

References

External links 

 see Lighthouses of the British Isles
lighthousesRus.org (England Page)
 

England
 
Lighthouses
Lighthouses